Adrian J. Walsh (born 1963) is an Australian philosopher and Professor of Philosophy at the University of New England (Australia).
He is known for his expertise on political philosophy, philosophy of economics and applied ethics.
Walsh is an Associate Editor of the Journal of Applied Philosophy.

Books
 The Morality of Money: An Exploration in Analytic Philosophy
 A Neo-Aristotelian Theory of Social Justice
 Usury: The Moral Foundations of Lending at Interest
 Ethics, Money and Sport: This Sporting Mammon

Edited books
 The Ethical Underpinnings of Climate Economics 
 Scientific Imperialism: Exploring the Boundaries of Interdisciplinarity

See also
Scientific imperialism
Business ethics
Economics of global warming
Philosophy of sport

References

External links
Adrian Walsh

Australian philosophers
Analytic philosophers
Philosophy academics
Living people
1963 births
Academic staff of the University of New England (Australia)
University of Melbourne alumni
Philosophers of language
Political philosophers
Flinders University alumni
Philosophers of economics
Philosophers of sport